Fred and George Weasley are fictional characters in the Harry Potter book series written by J. K. Rowling. The characters are the identical twin brothers of the Weasley family, making them the older brothers to Ron and Ginny and friends of Harry Potter. They are initial members of Dumbledore's Army later joining the Order of the Phoenix after their departure from Hogwarts. They are also the founders of Weasleys' Wizard Wheezes in Diagon Alley, a shop they opened post-graduation to sell their mischievous pranks. The twins were played by identical twin brothers James and Oliver Phelps in the film adaptations of the books.

Character biography 
Fred (1 April 1978 – 2 May 1998) and George (b. 1 April 1978) are identical<ref>"I'm not Fred, I'm George ... can't you tell I'm George?" Harry Potter and the Philosopher's Stone; Page 70 (UK edition); Page 92 (US edition).</ref> twin sons of Arthur and Molly Weasley, the younger brothers of Bill, Charlie, and Percy, and the older brothers of Ron and Ginny, who are both members of Harry Potter's close group of friends. The twins revel in practical jokes and pranks and are generally considered amusing by both the books' characters and readers. Their names mirror those of their deceased uncles Fabian and Gideon Prewett, brothers of their mother, Molly. Like their uncles, they join the fight against Voldemort.
When Fred Weasley was five years old, he had a toy broomstick, which he probably liked to play on. Their younger brother Ron, who was three years old at the time, accidentally broke Fred's broomstick, which made Fred angry and turn Ron's teddy bear into a spider, which causes Ron's fear of spiders.

While their best friend is Lee Jordan – their classmate, dormmate, and fellow prankster – the twins are also good friends with Harry, having played Quidditch with him for Gryffindor. In fact, they generally treat Harry better than they treat Ron. In Harry Potter and the Half-Blood Prince, they allow Harry to take anything from their joke shop for free while asking Ron to pay for the items in his arms (however, given that Harry gave them the money to start the shop, this can be seen as repaying a debt they feel they owe Harry). They love to torment Percy for being a model student and often their teasing of Ron is less than benign. They are close with Ginny (who closely resembles them both in appearance and personality) and vice versa. Like the other Weasleys, they have flaming red hair and are described as being on the shorter, stockier side like their second older brother Charlie.  In the movies, they are both shown as tall, handsome, and thin. They seem to be quite popular among the Gryffindors, as well as with students in other Houses and with some teachers.

The twins do appear to have some sense of what is morally right. At the end of the fourth book, Harry gives them his Tri-Wizard winnings so they can start their joke shop. They argue with him about it, trying to convince him to keep his money, and in the end, he actually threatens to jinx them if they don't take it.

In the film adaptations, Fred and George are played by real-life twins James and Oliver Phelps. Unlike the characters in the novels, the Phelps twins are quite tall and lanky. The actors are also not natural redheads and had to have their hair dyed for the films.

 Appearances 
 Students at Hogwarts 
Fred and George attend Hogwarts from 1989 to around springtime of the 1996 school year, and are two years ahead of Harry, Ron, and Hermione Granger. They are the school clowns and troublemakers, more interested in inventing new pranks than studying. Despite their unimpressive academic record, they show a high degree of knowledge and skill in creating magical jokes and tricks. Both play as Beaters on the Gryffindor Quidditch team and are very talented players.

Fred and George care little for Prefects or rules, which contributes in their eventual falling out with their older brother Percy. Their appearances and personalities are so indistinguishable that they can fool even their mother. Fred appears slightly more aggressive/take-charge than George, which is most apparent in Harry Potter and the Goblet of Fire where George is more cautious about blackmailing Ludo Bagman and, unlike Fred, is not mentioned as having a date at the Yule Ball. In Harry Potter and the Goblet of Fire, Fred's date was Angelina Johnson. Fred is also seen to speak a lot more often than George.

In Harry Potter and the Goblet of Fire, Fred and George begin selling their own jokes by owl order, under the name "Weasleys' Wizard Wheezes." They play a prank on Harry's first cousin, the fat, bullying Dudley Dursley by "accidentally" dropping a Ton Tongue Toffee – Dudley, a glutton on a forced diet, soon has a four-foot-long tongue protruding from his mouth. At the Quidditch World Cup they impress Ludo Bagman, Head of the Department of Magical Games and Sports at the Ministry of Magic, with their fake wands.

Their ambition in life has always been to run their own joke shop. Harry makes this possible by giving them his winnings from the Triwizard Tournament.

The pair provide Harry with useful assistance throughout the series; in Harry Potter and the Chamber of Secrets they and Ron help him escape his house arrest at Privet Drive. In Harry Potter and the Prisoner of Azkaban they give him the Marauder's Map. In Goblet of Fire, they try to encourage Harry and Ron to find dates to the Yule Ball by letting them see Fred ask Angelina Johnson. They also help Harry in Order of the Phoenix when Harry wishes to talk with his godfather, Sirius Black, by creating a distraction, leaving Hogwarts in a state of chaos. They were also members of Dumbledore's Army, a group started by Harry, Ron, and Hermione to teach practical instruction in Defence Against the Dark Arts, which Umbridge had removed from that course's curriculum.

Later that year, they are banned from Quidditch and decide to abandon formal education; before leaving, though, they pay tribute to Dumbledore by waging a prank war against the dictatorial Dolores Umbridge. Threatened with flogging for conjuring a swamp in a corridor, they depart on broomsticks, yelling to Peeves in the process, "Give her hell from us, Peeves."

It is stated by several characters, including Professor Flitwick and Hermione, that despite their poor grades and meager number of O.W.L.s, the Weasley twins are extremely proficient wizards, capable of sophisticated magic (such as spells for high-quality daydreams). This is evidenced by the large number of inventions they have created and by Fred's ability to transform Ron's teddy bear into a spider even before he was old enough to attend Hogwarts.

 After Hogwarts 
As they leave, the twins inform their fellow students of their new shop in Diagon Alley and offer discounts to students who will likewise harass Umbridge. The swamp, meanwhile, remains for some time, since Umbridge is unable to remove it and no other teacher particularly wishes to. After Professor Umbridge is driven from the school, Professor Flitwick removes it, but leaves a small bit as a tribute to the Weasley twins.

In The Half-Blood Prince, Fred and George continue to run their very successful joke shop, Weasleys' Wizard Wheezes, out of Diagon Alley with the help of at least one employee.  At the beginning of the school year, they have a large advertisement for a potion called "U-No-Poo," poking fun at the common euphemism of Lord Voldemort in the wizarding community. Their import item, Peruvian Instant Darkness Powder is used by Draco Malfoy to escape the detection of former DA members. It is unclear if Fred and George have joined the Order of the Phoenix as they wished during the previous book. Their wares have twice been indirectly responsible for injuries suffered by their siblings: their Instant Darkness Powder allowed the werewolf Fenrir Greyback into Hogwarts, where he proceeded to savage Bill Weasley; and a love potion sold by them was ingested by Ron Weasley, requiring him to seek an antidote from the Potions Master, Professor Slughorn — who then accidentally poisoned him.

Though Mrs. Weasley initially disapproved of their enterprises, she realised they had a natural gift and passion for their business and has since raised no objections. In fact, she is now rather impressed with how successful the twins have become since leaving school. According to their proud younger brother Ron, "they're raking in the Galleons!"

 Deathly Hallows 
In Harry Potter and the Deathly Hallows, Fred and George are members of the Order of the Phoenix and serve as two of Harry's six decoys when he escapes Privet Drive. George loses one of his ears to Snape's Sectumsempra curse (which was aimed at a Death Eater's wand hand, but missed). Mr. Weasley and Fred force their way into The Burrow  – Kingsley Shacklebolt didn't want to let them in until they proved who they were – and Fred is described as being lost for words for the first time since Harry met him. He remains pale and terrified, until George wakes up. When Mrs. Weasley asks George how he feels, he replies, 'Saintlike.' After some general confusion, he clarifies, saying that he is 'holey.' This causes his mother to sob harder, while Fred comes to himself and says that the joke was pathetic.
As the injury was caused by dark magic, it cannot be repaired. George remarks that, at the very least, he and his brother became much more distinguishable and their mother will be able to tell them apart now.

During this novel, every member of the Weasley family is being watched by the Ministry of Magic (now led by Death Eaters). It is impossible for Fred and George to return to their shop in Diagon Alley to sell their products, so they begin to run another owl-order business out of their Auntie Muriel's house.

During the Battle of Hogwarts, Fred is killed in an explosion. Before his death, Fred reconciles with his estranged brother Percy, who arrives at Hogwarts to participate in the fight and apologises to the family for not believing them. Percy, who was right next to him, was distraught, and refused to leave Fred's body. Fred died with a smile frozen on his face, as moments before death he was laughing at Percy for making a rare joke. Percy returns to the fight only after Harry helps him carry Fred into a niche where a suit of armor stood before it went to join the fight. Fred is the only member of the Weasley family who dies, and plays a factor in his mother's duel with Bellatrix Lestrange.

There are only two mentions of George after this. The first comes when Harry sees that the dead have been laid out in a row in the Great Hall. He can't see Fred's body, because he is surrounded by his family. George is only briefly described as kneeling at his twin's head. The second mention is when George and Lee Jordan defeat the Death Eater Yaxley.

According to Rowling, she always knew, intuitively, that Fred would be the one of the twins that would die, but she doesn't exactly know the reason. Although not mentioned in the novel, Rowling said in a web chat that George never does fully get over Fred's death. However, he goes on with his life, turning Weasleys' Wizarding Wheezes into a "money spinner" with Ron . George later names his first child with Angelina Johnson after his twin.

 Personality 
Throughout the series, the twins are portrayed as troublemakers. They break, or in their minds, bend, the rules often. In Harry Potter and the Goblet of Fire an age limit was enacted and they were upset they were unable to participate. After Dumbledore creates an age line, allowing only those 17 and over to walk across it, they made a potion that aged themselves a few months to try to get their names entered in the goblet. However, this did not work and they instead sprouted beards and had to be sent to the Hospital Wing to receive treatment. Even though they love their mischievous behavior, the twins explain to Hermione in Harry Potter and the Order of the Phoenix that they do care about getting in serious trouble, giving evidence that despite all their nuisances, they have never been kicked out of school. "We've always known where to draw the line," says Fred. "We might have put a toe across it occasionally," adds George. With Dumbledore out of Hogwarts, they decide to cause real mayhem for the hated Dolores Umbridge, something that they had always stopped short of before. They create a swamp in the corridors to allow a diversion so Harry can sneak into a conversation with Sirius. Before Umbridge can punish them, they summon their confiscated brooms and depart the school, referenced as a "flight of freedom". This memorable scene would in later years still be talked about and referred to as a "Hogwarts legend." Other students echoed this sentiment and the term "pulling a Weasley" was said often by unhappy students who were ready to leave school as well.

The twins display a genuine loyalty to Harry, Ron, and Hermione, generosity to strangers, and a protective nature. George was the first Weasley to befriend Harry (not yet realizing he was the famous Harry Potter). When Harry arrives alone at the train station before beginning his first year at Hogwarts, George sees him struggling with his heavy school trunk and calls Fred over to help load it onto the train. In Harry Potter and the Chamber of Secrets, Malfoy addresses Hermione as a 'Mudblood' and the twins get worked up at this vulgarity; they jump to her defense, so angry that Malfoy had to be blocked. When Harry is unable to go on Hogsmeade trips in Harry Potter and the Prisoner of Azkaban, they give him the Marauder's Map and show him a secret passage out of the castle so he can participate in the trips with his friends. In Harry Potter and the Half-Blood Prince, the twins show up in Hogsmeade to surprise Ron on his seventeenth birthday. After Ron had been accidentally poisoned that morning, the twins show genuine concern and worry for him. They deliver his birthday gifts at his bedside as he sits in the hospital wing recovering.

In Harry Potter and the Order of the Phoenix, when Mr. Weasley is attacked by a snake, Fred and George get into a furious argument with Sirius. They want to go and see him in the hospital, but, as Sirius points out, this would lead to awkward questioning, as the news has not been released yet. The only reason the Weasleys and a few others know about it is that Harry dreamed it. Fred shouts at Sirius, "We don't care about the dumb Order!" and George adds, "It's our Dad dying we're talking about!" They remain unusually serious until it is revealed that their Father will live.

Rowling stated that George "was the quieter of the two", while she described Fred as "the ringleader, crueler and funnier twin."

 Family tree 

 Reception 
Fred and George are often seen as being the comedic focus of the Harry Potter series. As such, they are often seen as some of the biggest fan favourite characters. IGN ranked the twins as the 11th best characters in the franchise, stating, "The more they pestered and prodded at Ron, the more we realized that they were the kind of older brothers that we all would have wanted to grow up with." The death of Fred in Harry Potter and the Deathly Hallows was the first death author J.K. Rowling apologised for, stating that his death was the worst for her personally. Ever since apologising for the death of the character, Rowling has made an annual tradition of apologising to the fans of the series for the deaths of their favourite characters on the fictitious anniversary of the Battle of Hogwarts. To date, Rowling has apologised for the deaths of Remus Lupin, Severus Snape, Dobby the House Elf and Sirius Black, along with Fred’s.

During the filming of Harry Potter and the Deathly Hallows – Part 2'', the scene where George mourns the death of Fred was only able to be filmed twice, as the filming was emotionally draining for George's actor Oliver Phelps to imagine that his brother had passed. Fred's actor James however, found the scene to be "the easiest day of work" and fell asleep during shooting of the scene, missing his lunch break.

References

External links 

Fred and George at the Harry Potter Lexicon

Fred Weasley at Pottermore
George Weasley at Pottermore

Fictional blackmailers
Fictional businesspeople
Fictional English people
Fictional identical twins
Fictional inventors
Fictional members of secret societies
Fictional shopkeepers
Fictional tricksters
Fictional war veterans
Fictional wizards
Harry Potter characters
Literary characters introduced in 1997
Male characters in film
Male characters in literature
Teenage characters in film
Teenage characters in literature
Film characters introduced in 2001